Karate at the 2010 Asian Games was held in Guangzhou, China between 24 and 26 November 2010. All competition took place at the Guangdong Gymnasium.

Schedule

Medalists

Men

Women

Medal table

Participating nations
A total of 183 athletes from 34 nations competed in karate at the 2010 Asian Games:

References

External links
Official website

 
2010 Asian Games events
2010
Asian Games
2010 Asian Games